Ayatollah Sayyed Abbas Almohri (1915–1988) was one of the first Kuwaiti Shia scholars based in Kuwait. He was born in Iran in the province of Fars. He studied religion in Najaf and then he went to Kuwait to help people learn more about their religion and specifically the creed of Shia.

He helped Ayatollah Khomeini in his revolution against the Shah of Iran. Later he started a political reformist movement in his country. Within a few months of the Islamic Revolution, in 1979, he was forced to leave Kuwait with his family as the authorities sought to prevent an Islamic Revolution in the state (Ghabra, S.N. 1995).

Abbas Almohri's family members are Kuwaiti nationals. His eldest son Ayatollah Sayyed Mohammad Almohri was a scholar in Kuwait. He was Imam of Shaban mosque (after his father) in Sharq, Kuwait. 
His younger son Ayatollah Sayyed Mortadha Almohri is a former jurisprudence student of Ayatollah Sistani.

Notes

References
 موقع سماحة العلامة المرحوم السيد عباس المهري
 Ghabra, S.N. (1995), Kuwait: A Study in the diametrical state, authority and community mechanisms.

Kuwaiti Shia Muslims
Kuwaiti people of Iranian descent
1915 births
1988 deaths
Al-Moussawi family
Kuwaiti revolutionaries